"Soul Serenade" is a jazz instrumental written by King Curtis (Curtis Ousley) and Luther Dixon. Curtis played the lead on a B-flat saxello, a version of the alto sax.  The song was released on Curtis' 1964 album "Soul Serenade".

Cover versions
Aretha Franklin on I Never Loved a Man the Way I Love You (1967)
Willie Mitchell, backed by Cannonball Adderley's "Mercy, Mercy, Mercy"; It peaked at #43 in the UK Singles Chart in April 1968. 
The Allman Brothers Band, woven into a performance of Willie Cobbs' "You Don't Love Me" during a concert, "Live from A&R Studios", held in Manhattan on August 26, 1971, and broadcast by WPLJ-FM.  The song was released on the band's Dreams compilation in 1989.
The Derek Trucks Band on Soul Serenade (2003) and Songlines Live (DVD, 2006)
Gloria Lynne
Maxine Brown
David Sanborn
Jeff Golub

References

1968 singles
1968 songs
1964 songs
Capitol Records singles
Songs written by Luther Dixon
Hi Records singles